= Simpson Pavilion =

- Interactive map of the Simpson Pavilion area

General information
- Type: Sports facility
- Location: 44°2′53.4″N 121°19′25.7″W, Bend, Oregon, United States
- Construction started: 2014
- Completed: ongoing

Design and construction
- Architect: Opsis Architecture

Simpson Pavilion, or Bend Simpson Pavilion, is a sports pavilion in Bend, Oregon, United States. Plans were unveiled in late 2013, and construction began in late 2014. The project includes a $11.3 million ice rink, and courts for basketball, tennis, and volleyball, among other sports.
